The 1310s was a decade of the Julian Calendar which began on January 1, 1310, and ended on December 31, 1319.

Significant people
 Louis the Bavarian
 Wang Zhen (inventor)

References